Stutz typically refers to the Stutz Motor Company, an American luxury car manufacturer.

Stutz may also refer to:

Stutz (surname), and a list of people with the name
Gerhard Stüdemann (1920–1988), a Luftwaffe pilot nicknamed "Stutz"
Stutz (film), a 2022 documentary directed by Jonah Hill